Michael Ehlert Falch (born 16 September 1956 in Køge, Denmark) is a Danish singer, guitarist, author and actor.

In rock band Malurt

Michael Falch started his career as a lead singer and musician in the Danish rock band Malurt established in 1977 and made up of 5 members: Michael Falch (vocals and guitar), Christian Arendt (guitar), Henrik Littauer (keyboards), Peter Mors (drums) and Dia Nielsen (bass). In 1982, changes were made with guitarist Christian Arendt replacing Peter Viskinde and keyboardist Pete Repete replacing Henrik Littauer.

Malurt found success with a number of albums for the period 1976-1984. After a long hiatus stretching six years, Malurt was restored in 1990, with a debut concert during Roskilde Festival. It went on to release four more albums before being put on hold in 1994, without officially dissolving. They reunited for brief 25th anniversary tour in September 2005.

Solo career
After the initial break-up of the band, Michael Falch went on solo releasing more than a dozen albums, including a compilation album and a live album. "Mød mig i mørket" and "I et land uden høje bjerge" are some of his best known songs.

Since 2002, he has been appearing at a number of solo concerts and in 2006 toured with the band Boat Man Love and in 2009-2010 with Poul Krebs.

Besides a busy musical career, he has appeared in roles in television series and in films winning the Bodil prize for one of his roles in the film Mord i mørket directed by Dan Turèll.

Personal life
Michael Falch married Linda Lyneborg in 1983 and they three children, Anna, Soffi and Mathilde. He suffered from alcoholism and in 2002 went in for rehabilitation in Behandlingscenter Tjelehad establishment for treatment of alcohol abuse.

Michael Falch and his wife Linda Lyneborg divorced in 2006. Michael Falch resides in Vester Bøgebjerg near Boeslunde.

In 2007, journalist Torben Bille wrote a biography of Falch titled Ud af mørket published by Gyldendal.

Discography
(For discography with Malurt, see the band's page on Wikipedia)

Albums
Earlier period
1985: Michael Falch
1986: Det andet land 
1988: 26 hits (Michael Falch & Malurt)
1988: De vildeste fugle
1989: Håbets hotel
1990: Tossede verden
1995: De 17 bedste (compilation album)
1996: The Best of Michael Falch (1986–1988)  (compilation album)
1996: Stævnemøder
1998: Nye rejsende
1999: Mød mig i mørket

Charting studio albums

Live and compilation albums

Albums with Boat Man Love
2007: Sang til undren (DEN #9)
2008: I kampens hede
2011: Fredagsrock 2011

Live album with Poul Krebs
2010: Live akustisk

References

External links 
 

Danish male television actors
Danish male film actors
Best Actor Bodil Award winners
People from Køge Municipality
People from Slagelse Municipality
1956 births
Living people
20th-century Danish male singers